Kian Abad (also Romanized as Kīānābād and Kīyân-âbâd; also known as Kainābād and Kīnābād) is a village in Qarah Bagh Rural District, in the Central District of Shiraz County, Fars Province, Iran. At the 2017 census, its population was 5,039, in 1,389 families.

References 

Populated places in Shiraz County